Vladić is a Serbo-Croatian surname, derived from the Slavic given name Vlad. It may refer to:

 Franjo Vladić, Bosnian Croat footballer
 Indira Vladić, Croatian singer
 Radoslav Vladić, Serbian academic

Croatian surnames
Serbian surnames
Patronymic surnames
Surnames from given names